NGC 911 is an elliptical galaxy located in the constellation Andromeda about 258 million light years from the Milky Way. It was discovered by French astronomer Édouard Stephan in 1878. It is a member of the galaxy cluster Abell 347.

See also 
 List of NGC objects (1–1000)

References

External links
 

Elliptical galaxies
Andromeda (constellation)
0911
009221